The 2017 Nicholls State Colonels football team represented Nicholls State University as a member of the Southland Conference during the 2017 NCAA Division I FCS football season. Led by third-year head coach Tim Rebowe, the Colonels compiled an overall record of 8–4 with a mark of 7–2 in conference play, tying for third place in the Southland. Nicholls State received an at-large bid to the NCAA Division I Football Championship, losing to South Dakota in the first round. The team played home games at John L. Guidry Stadium in Thibodaux, Louisiana.

Schedule

Ranking movements

References

Nicholls State
Nicholls Colonels football seasons
Nicholls State
Nicholls State Colonels football